Fernando Macarro Castillo (20 January 1920 in Alconada – 24 November 2016 in Madrid), better known by his pseudonym Marcos Ana, was a Spanish poet and is considered by numerous sources Spain's longest serving political prisoner. Under the Francoist Spain, he was convicted of first degree murder of three people (a priest, a postman and a farmer) at the age of 19 in 1939, crimes he always denied having committed. He was released in 1961 after 23 years of imprisonment.

He spent 23 years in prison, longer than any other republican combatant, being released in 1961 and exiled in Paris. He told his story in the 2007 memoir Tell Me What a Tree Is Like.

See also
Political prisoners in Francoist Spain

References

Further reading
 

1920 births
2016 deaths
Spanish journalists
People from the Province of Salamanca
Spanish Communist poets
Spanish expatriates in France